New Herrnhut may refer to:

 Old Nuuk, now the capital of Greenland, originally established as a Moravian mission known as Neu-Herrnhut or Nye-Hernhut
 New Herrnhut Moravian Church, a Moravian mission in Charlotte Amalie, Virgin Islands